The Best of '94–'99 is a greatest hits double album by British rock band Bush. Disc one consists of the band's hit songs, while disc two is their performance at Woodstock '99. The collection omits their singles "The People That We Love" and "Inflatable" from Golden State, due to lack of licensing rights.

Track listing

Tracks 1–5 are originally from the album Sixteen Stone.  Tracks 6 and 7 are originally from the album Razorblade Suitcase.  Tracks 8–10 are originally from the album The Science of Things.  Tracks 11–13 are originally from the remix album Deconstructed.

DVD edition
The DVD version of the album omits the three remixes, and combines the music videos and the live performance on a single disc.

Band Members
Bush
Gavin Rossdale – lead vocals, rhythm guitar
Nigel Pulsford – lead guitar, backing vocals
Dave Parsons – bass
Robin Goodridge – drums

References

Bush (British band) compilation albums
2005 greatest hits albums
SPV/Steamhammer compilation albums
2005 live albums
SPV/Steamhammer live albums